The 2015–16 Alabama–Huntsville Chargers ice hockey team represented the University of Alabama in Huntsville in the 2015–16 NCAA Division I men's ice hockey season. The Chargers were coached by Mike Corbett who was in his third season as head coach. His assistant coaches were Gavin Morgan and Matty Thomas. The Chargers played their home games in the Propst Arena at the Von Braun Center and competed in the Western Collegiate Hockey Association.

Recruiting
UAH added 9 freshmen for the 2015–16 season, including 6 forwards and 3 defensemen.

Roster

Departures from 2014–15 team
Alex Carpenter, F, Graduated
Craig Pierce, F, Graduated
Doug Reid, F, Graduated, signed with the Knoxville Ice Bears (SPHL)
Ben Reinhardt, D, Graduated
Bryan Siersma, F, joined UAH's lacrosse team
Graeme Strukoff, D, Graduated, signed with the Fayetteville FireAntz (SPHL)
Jeff Vanderlugt, F, Graduated

2015–16 team
As of November 16, 2015

|}

Schedule and results
  Green background indicates win.
  Red background indicates loss.
  Yellow background indicates tie.

|-
!colspan=12 style=""| Regular Season

Standings

Player stats
As of March 5, 2016

Skaters

Goaltenders

References

Alabama–Huntsville Chargers men's ice hockey seasons
Alabama Huntsville
Alabama-Huntsville Chargers men's ice hockey
Alabama-Huntsville Chargers men's ice hockey